Antikythera mechanism – A device for plotting positions of heavenly bodies. Discovered off the island of Antikythera, Greece
 Book of Silk – Drawings of comets unearthed from Han tomb number 3 at Mawangdui Han tombs site, Changsha, China
 Golden hats – Tall conical hats said to be embossed with symbols of astronomical significance from Bronze Age Central Europe
 Grooves (archaeology) - grooves found in rock in northern Europe and particularly on Gotland, Sweden
 Nebra sky disk – A bronze disc said to date from the Bronze Age which portrays the cosmos. From Nebra, Germany
 Trundholm sun chariot – A bronze sun disc pulled by a horse from Trundholm, Zealand, Denmark

Archaeoastronomy